Yamal to Its Descendants is an indigenous organisation of the Nenets people, a Samoyedic group of the Yamalo-Nenets Autonomous Okrug of northern Russia. Since 1953, the organisation has published a newspaper,  ("The Red North") with articles in Nenets language and separate articles in Russian, covering issues pertinent to the indigenous peoples of the region.

References

Nenets people
Culture of Yamalo-Nenets Autonomous Okrug
Indigenous rights organizations in Asia
Indigenous rights organizations in Europe
Politics of Siberia
Human rights organizations based in Russia
Indigenous peoples of North Asia